In mathematics, finiteness properties of a group are a collection of properties that allow the use of various algebraic and topological tools, for example group cohomology, to study the group. It is mostly of interest for the study of infinite groups. 

Special cases of groups with finiteness properties are finitely generated and finitely presented groups.

Topological finiteness properties 

A group is said to be of type F∞ if it is of type Fn for every n. It is of type F if there exists a finite aspherical CW-complex of which it is the fundamental group.

For small values of n these conditions have more classical interpretations: 
 a group is of type F1 if and only if it is finitely generated (the rose with petals indexed by a finite generating family is the 1-skeleton of a classifying space, the Cayley graph of the group for this generating family is the 1-skeleton of its universal cover);

 a group is of type F2 if and only if it is finitely presented (the presentation complex, i.e. the rose with petals indexed by a finite generating set and 2-cells corresponding to each relation, is the 2-skeleton of a classifying space, whose universal cover has the Cayley complex as its 2-skeleton). 

It is known that for every n ≥ 1 there are groups of type Fn which are not of type Fn+1. Finite groups are of type F∞ but not of type F. Thompson's group  is an example of a torsion-free group which is of type F∞ but not of type F.

A reformulation of the Fn property is that a group has it if and only if it acts properly discontinuously, freely and cocompactly on a CW-complex whose homotopy groups  vanish. Another finiteness property can be formulated by replacing homotopy with homology: a group is said to be of type FHn if it acts as above on a CW-complex whose n first homology groups vanish.

Algebraic finiteness properties 

Let  be a group and  its group ring. The group  is said to be of type FPn if there exists a resolution of the trivial -module  such that the n first terms are finitely generated projective -modules. The types FP∞ and FP are defined in the obvious way. 

The same statement with projective modules replaced by free modules defines the classes FLn for n ≥ 1, FL∞ and FL. 

Either of the conditions Fn or FHn imply FPn and FLn (over any commutative ring). A group is of type FP1 if and only if it is finitely generated, but for any n ≥ 2 there exists groups which are of type FPn but not Fn.

Group cohomology 

If it is of type FP then it is of finite cohomological dimension. Thus finiteness properties play an important role in the cohomology theory of groups.

Examples

Finite groups 

Since this unit sphere is contractible, every finite cyclic group is of type F∞.  

This shows that every finite group is of type F∞.  

A non-trivial finite group is never of type F because it has infinite cohomological dimension. This also implies that a group with a non-trivial torsion subgroup is never of type F.

Nilpotent groups 

If  is a torsion-free, finitely generated nilpotent group then it is of type F.

Geometric conditions for finiteness properties 

Negatively curved groups (hyperbolic or CAT(0) groups) are always of type F∞. Such a group is of type F if and only if it is torsion-free. 

As an example, cocompact S-arithmetic groups in algebraic groups over number fields are of type F∞. The Borel–Serre compactification shows that this is also the case for non-cocompact arithmetic groups. 

Arithmetic groups over function fields have very different finiteness properties: if  is an arithmetic group in a simple algebraic group of rank  over a global function field (such as ) then it is of type Fr but not of type Fr+1.

Notes

References 

 
 

Group theory
Homological algebra
Geometric group theory